Beomeosa (Temple of the Nirvana Fish) is a head temple of the Jogye Order of Korean Buddhism in Cheongnyong-dong, Geumjeong-gu, Busan, South Korea.  Built on the slopes of Geumjeongsan, it is one of the country's best known urban temples.

Origin of name 
The mountain where Beomeosa is found is said to have huge rock at the summit where there is a golden well which never, ever dries up. The water of this well is believed to have very special magical properties as one day a golden fish came from heaven and has lived there ever since.

Beom(범;梵) = Nirvāṇa - eo(어;魚) = fish - sa(사;寺) = temple.  Thus the name of the temple came to be ＂Heavenly Fish.＂ It is also claimed that the fish came from Nirvana, the Buddhist state of non-suffering. Therefore, the temple also became known as ＂The temple where fish from Nirvana Play.＂

On December 26, 2011, the Los Angeles Times printed a story of the fighting monks at this temple.  South Korean Buddhist monk Ando demonstrates Sunmudo martial arts techniques. Monks from Beomeosa Temple are famed for defeating Japanese invaders during the late 16th century and again during the Japanese occupation of Korea in the early 20th century.

History 
Beomeosa Temple (Korean: 범어사, Chinese: 梵魚寺, Pronounced “Beo-meo-sa”) is located on Mt. Geumjeongsan in Busan, and was established in 678 as one of the ten major temples of the Avatamsaka School.  According to the Sinjeung dongguk yeoji seungnam (新增東國輿地勝覽; Revised Academic Geography for the Eastern Country), a golden fish descended from heaven and frolicked in a well on this mountaintop. Thus, the mountain was named “Geumjeongsan (金井山; literally ‘Golden Well Mountain’),” and the temple built on it was named “Beomeosa (梵魚寺; literally ‘Spiritual Fish Temple’).”

As it was established by decree of King Munmu, Beomeosa Temple began on 360 gyeol of land and had 360 dormitory rooms. However, it was almost reduced to ashes during the Japanese invasion (1592-1597). Later, in 1613, monks like Ven. Myojeon and Ven. Haemin renovated some of its Dharma halls and the dormitory. The Main Buddha Hall and One Pillar Gate are known to have been built at that time.

Beomeosa Temple is considered one of the three major temples in southeast Korea, along with Haeinsa Temple and Tongdosa Temple. Its strong Seon Buddhist spirit has earned it the title “Great Headquarters Temple of Seon Buddhism.” Seon Master Gyeongheo,  an eminent monk of modern times, opened a Seon center at Beomeosa in 1900. Inspired by Ven. Gyeongheo, Seongwol,  then abbot of Beomeosa, taught the Seon tradition by establishing Seon centers and Seon assemblies in Beomeosa's six hermitages in the span of 10 years as follows: Geumgangam in 1899; Anyangam in 1900; Gyemyeongam in 1902; Wonhyoam in 1906; Ansimnyo in 1909; and Daeseongam in 1910.

Eminent monks who have lived at the temple include Great Masters Uisang, Pyohun, Nangbaek, Myeonghak, Gyeongheo, Yongseong, Manhae and Dongsan. Even today, Beomeosa Temple teaches serious Buddhist practice. In 2012, the temple was designated a Geumjeong Chongnim, one of eight comprehensive monastic training complexes for the Jogye Order of Korean Buddhism, and its first spiritual patriarch is Master Jiyu.

Landscape 
The superb scenery of Mt. Geumjeongsan and Beomeosa Temple are called the “three extraordinary sites of Beomeosa Temple” and “eight scenic wonders of Mt. Geumjeongsan.” The three extraordinary sites are: the rock peak behind Wonhyoam Hermitage; two rocks in the shape of a chicken at Gyemyeongam Hermitage; and the legendary “golden well” on top of Mt. Geumjeongsan. 
 
The eight scenic wonders refer to: the pine forest around Eosan Bridge at the entrance of the temple; moonlit autumn nights at Gyemyeongam Hermitage; rain at night at Cheongnyeonam Hermitage; the sound of the temple bell heard from Naewonam Hermitage; the murmuring of the mountain stream at Daeseongam Hermitage; late autumn foliage at Geumgangam Hermitage; the view of the sea from Uisang Peak; and the clouds encircling Godang Peak, the summit of Mt. Geumjeongsan.

Treasures 
Well before reaching the Beomeosa Temple compound, visitors first see Jogyemun (Treasure No. 1461),  the One Pillar Gate. All of its four pillars have short wooden columns sitting on high stone bases.

Around the temple is a mass of wild wisteria, consisting of over 6,500 plants (Natural Monument No. 176). Every year in late spring, their lavender blossoms create an extraordinary sight, unseen anywhere else in Korea. That's why this valley has been called since ancient times “Deungungok (藤雲谷; ‘Wisteria Blossom Valley’).”

The temple complex has several buildings and other objects which are designated as official treasures:

 Treasure 250 - Three Story Stone Pagoda. This pagoda dates back to the Unified Shilla era probably erected as part of the original temple that was destroyed by fire in 1592.  Only the top three-stories are from the Shilla where the base and fence are later additions.
 Treasure 434 - Daeungjeon, the main temple hall, was built in 1614 after the temple was burned down during the Japanese invasion of 1592.  Major renovations of Daeungjeon were undertaken in 1713, 1814 and 1871.
 Tangible Cultural Asset 2 - Iljumun. The first gate to the temple, called the "One Pillar Gate"  because when viewed from the side the gate appears to be supported by a single pillar, symbolizing the one true path of enlightenment, supporting the world.
 Tangible Cultural Assets 11 and 12 - Wonhyoam Eastern Pagoda and Wonhyoam Western Pagoda. Wonhyoam (hermitage) is located to the south of Beomeosa and is the site of these two pagodas. This the site of the former residence of the famous Shilla monk, Wonhyo.
 Tangible Cultural Asset 15 - Flag Pole Holder. These two very old stone structures, called a jiju, were used to support a flagpole between them. The stones are found on the path up to Beomeosa's main gate.
 Tangible Cultural Asset 16 - Stone Lamp.  This lamp dates back to the Unified Shilla era and was part of the original temple that was destroyed by fire in 1592.

Gallery - Main Temple

Hermitages 

 Chungryungam (Blue Lotus Hermitage)
 Naewonam (Buddha's Celestial Teaching Hall Hermitage)
 Kyemyongam (Rooster's Crow Hermitage)
 Daesongam (Great Saint Hermitage)
 Geumgangam (Diamond Hermitage)
 Anyangam (Peace Nurturing Hermitage)
 Mirukam (Maitreya Hermitage)
 Wonhyoam (Former hermitage residence of the famous monk, Wonhyo)
 Sajaam (Lion Hermitage)
 Mansongam (Great Teacher Hermitage)
 Chijangam (Ksitigarbha Hermitage)

Tourism  
It also offers temple stay programs where visitors can experience Buddhist culture.

Gallery - Chungryungam

See also 

 Jogye Order
 Korean Buddhism
 Korean Buddhist temples
 Temple Stay
 Three Jewel Temples of Korea

References

External links 
 Official site, in Korean
 Asian Historical Architecture: Beomeosa
 

Religious organizations established in the 7th century
Religious buildings and structures in Busan
Buddhist temples in South Korea
Buddhist temples of the Jogye Order
Fish in Buddhism
Tourist attractions in Busan
Geumjeong District
7th-century establishments in Korea
Religious buildings and structures completed in 678
7th-century Buddhist temples